The 2018 NASCAR Camping World Truck Series was the 24th season of the third highest stock car racing series sanctioned by NASCAR in North America. Christopher Bell entered as the defending champion, but he did not defend his championship, leaving his No. 4 Kyle Busch Motorsports entry to a number of drivers throughout the season, with Todd Gilliland covering the majority of the schedule in the truck. Title sponsor Camping World Holdings rebranded the series with their Gander Outdoors brand they acquired in 2017 for the 2019 season, replacing the Camping World brand.

This was the third year that the Truck Series (and the Xfinity Series) had a playoff system. For the first time in the three years of the playoffs at that time, Christopher Bell and Matt Crafton were not part of the "championship 4" drivers competing for the title at Homestead. Bell had moved up to the Xfinity Series full-time, while Crafton did qualify for the postseason but did not advance to the last round of the playoffs as he had done the past two years.

The 2018 season was also the first to feature the regular season championship trophy, which was awarded at the final race before the playoffs. Johnny Sauter clinched the NCWTS Regular Season Championship trophy at the end of the UNOH 200 at Bristol Motor Speedway. Brett Moffitt was declared the NCWTS Champion for 2018, after winning the Ford EcoBoost 200 at Homestead-Miami Speedway. In addition, Hattori Racing Enterprises won the NCWTS Owners' Championship.

Teams and drivers

Complete schedule

Limited schedule

Notes

Changes

Drivers
 On October 30, 2017, it was announced that Austin Wayne Self would drive full-time for Niece Motorsports. Self had driven part-time for multiple teams including Niece, AM Racing and Martins Motorsports in 2017. On December 12, 2017, it was announced that Justin Fontaine would drive a second truck, numbered 45, alongside Self. Niece also formed a technical alliance with GMS Racing.
 On November 10, 2017, it was announced that Austin Hill would run the full season for Young's Motorsports in the No. 02. He had run part-time for the team in 2017.
 On February 7, it was announced that Brett Moffitt would drive full-time for Hattori Racing Enterprises in the team's No. 16 truck, replacing Ryan Truex. Moffitt had driven part-time in the Truck Series with Red Horse Racing in 2017. He had also previously driven for HRE in the NASCAR K&N Pro Series East.
 On January 8, 2018, it was announced that Harrison Burton would be driving 9 races for Kyle Busch Motorsports in the No. 51 Toyota Tundra. Burton will be in the truck at Martinsville in the spring and fall, Dover, Iowa, Bristol, Canadian Tire Motorsport Park, Texas in the fall, ISM Raceway in Phoenix, and Homestead-Miami. On January 11, it was announced that team owner Kyle Busch will drive the No. 51 truck in three races: Las Vegas in the spring, Charlotte, and Pocono. On January 23, it was announced that JGR NASCAR Xfinity Series driver Brandon Jones, as well as NASCAR Next alum Spencer Davis and Riley Herbst, would drive the No. 51 for most of the rest of the season, with Jones and Herbst also making one start apiece in the team's No. 46 entry.
 On January 17, 2018, it was announced that Todd Gilliland will drive the No. 4 truck full-time effective May 15, when he reaches the minimum age for full-time drivers (18).  Gilliland will drive in both age-eligible races at Martinsville and Dover prior to his birthday. In 2017, Gilliland drove full-time in both the NASCAR K&N Pro Series East and West, driving the No. 16 Toyota Camry for Bill McAnally Racing and winning the West series championship. Gilliland also made Truck starts for Kyle Busch Motorsports, driving the No. 46 and No. 51 Toyota Tundras at age-eligible races in the previous season. 
 On January 12, 2018, it was announced that Dalton Sargeant would be racing full-time for GMS Racing driving the No. 25 Chevrolet Silverado. Sargeant will also compete for Rookie of the Year honors. In 2017, Sargeant drove full-time in the ARCA Racing Series, driving the No. 77 Ford Fusion for Cunningham Motorsports. Sargeant also made a few starts in the Truck Series, driving the No. 99 MDM Motorsports Chevrolet Silverado.
 On January 16, 2018, it was announced that Cody Coughlin would be joining GMS Racing in 2018, driving the No. 2 Chevrolet Silverado. In 2017, Coughlin drove the No. 13 Toyota Tundra for ThorSport Racing.
 On January 23, 2018, it was announced that Robby Lyons would run the full season for Premium Motorsports in 2018 in the No. 15 Chevrolet. Lyons previously drove a two races for Premium in 2017, driving the organization's No. 49 entry. It was later announced prior to the spring Dover race that Lyons's sponsorship deal fell through, and he would be replaced by part-time Premium Motorsports Cup Series driver Ross Chastain. Lyons would return to the truck at Kansas.
 On January 25, 2018, it was announced that Chris Eggleston would drive a partial schedule for the new David Gilliland Racing-Crosley Sports Group team. Eggleston had last run in the Truck Series in 2014.
 On January 31, 2018, it was announced that Jordan Anderson would run his own team for the 2018 season with support from Niece Motorsports. He will drive a Toyota Tundra for the restrictor plate tracks and alternate other manufacturers throughout the season.
 On February 2, 2018, it was announced that Max McLaughlin, son of longtime Busch Series driver Mike McLaughlin, had signed a driver development contract with Niece Motorsports, and will run at least four races for the team in 2018. He will make his debut at Eldora.
 On February 7, 2018, it was announced that Myatt Snider would be joining ThorSport Racing in 2018, driving the No.13 Ford F-150. Last year Snider drove the No. 51 Kyle Busch Motorsports Toyota Tundra part-time.

Teams
 On August 17, 2017, Brad Keselowski announced the shutdown of Brad Keselowski Racing after the 2017 season.
 On December 30, 2017, Martins Motorsports announced the closure of the team. Team owner Tommy Joe Martins stated that deals with other drivers to drive the truck had fell through, and that he is driving a partial Xfinity Series schedule with B. J. McLeod Motorsports in 2018.
 On January 22, 2018, David Gilliland Racing and Crosley Sports Group announced a merger of their teams which includes an expansion to a single truck driver development team in the Camping World Truck Series with support from Toyota Racing Development and an alliance with Kyle Busch Motorsports. These teams will continue to field cars in late models, the K&N Pro Series, and the ARCA racing series. Bo LeMastus will drive the No. 54 Toyota.
 Young's Motorsports formed an alliance with Team Dillon to put Team Dillon drivers in a second Young's truck, the No. 20. The No. 20 ran part-time in 2017 but will run the length of the schedule in 2018.

Manufacturers
 On January 16, 2018, it was announced that, after a six-year relationship, ThorSport Racing split ways with Toyota. On January 22, 2018, Ford was announced to be the new manufacturer for the team.

Engine rules
 Teams may use an Ilmor-built LSX 396 engine, similar to the ARCA Racing Series, in 2018, regardless of manufacturer of the body.

Schedule

The final schedule – comprising 23 races – was released on May 23, 2017.

Schedule changes
In 2015, NASCAR and 21 Camping World Truck Series tracks agreed on a five-year contract that guarantees each track would continue to host races through 2020. Despite the agreement, Speedway Motorsports decided to cancel the New Hampshire Motor Speedway race and add a second race at Las Vegas Motor Speedway, to form two weekends involving each of the three national series. The new race will be the third race of the regular season, while the established fall race will be the second race of the first playoff round.

As a result, the Chevrolet Silverado 250 at Canadian Tire Motorsport Park will be held as the first race of the playoffs, while the Overton's 225 at Chicagoland Speedway will move from September to June.  The UNOH 200 at Bristol Motor Speedway will become the final race of the regular season as a result of the schedule realignment.

Unlike the 2017 schedule, the JEGS 200 at Dover International Speedway will precede the 37 Kind Days 250 at Kansas Speedway and the North Carolina Education Lottery 200 at Charlotte Motor Speedway. Also, the Eaton 200 at Gateway Motorsports Park will be held one week later as the tenth race of the season, slated to be held the week before the Chicagoland round.

On April 17, 2018, Bristol Motor Speedway announced the UNOH 200 will be moved one day to Thursday night, August 16.  The new race date will also reflect a change from FS1 to Fox, as the race broadcast moves to the broadcast network.  The live Thursday night race on Fox coincides with preparation for Fox to broadcast the majority of Thursday games during the 2018 NFL season.  Fox will now air two Truck Series races, both during the second half of the season when NBC has the Monster Energy NASCAR Cup and Xfinity Series coverage.

Results and standings

Race results

Drivers' standings

(key) Bold – Pole position awarded by time. Italics – Pole position set by final practice results or owner's points. * – Most laps led. 1 – Stage 1 winner. 2 – Stage 2 winner. 1-10 – Regular season top 10 finishers.
. – Eliminated after Round of 8
. – Eliminated after Round of 6

Owners' championship (Top 15)
(key) Bold – Pole position awarded by time. Italics – Pole position set by final practice results or rainout. * – Most laps led. 1 – Stage 1 winner. 2 – Stage 2 winner. 1-10 – Owners' regular season top 10 finishers. 
. – Eliminated after Round of 8
. – Eliminated after Round of 6

Manufacturers' Championship

See also

 2018 Monster Energy NASCAR Cup Series
 2018 NASCAR Xfinity Series
 2018 ARCA Racing Series
 2018 NASCAR K&N Pro Series East
 2018 NASCAR K&N Pro Series West
 2018 NASCAR Whelen Modified Tour
 2018 NASCAR Pinty's Series
 2018 NASCAR PEAK Mexico Series
 2018 NASCAR Whelen Euro Series

References

NASCAR Truck Series seasons
2018 NASCAR Camping World Truck Series